The Men's 800 metre freestyle competition of the 2019 African Games was held on 21 August 2019.

Records
Prior to the competition, the existing world and championship records were as follows.

Results

References

Men's 800 metre freestyle